Mehmet Muslimov (born August 14, 1964) is a Russian linguist, and an expert in Finno-Ugric languages. He is a member of Strana Yazykov, a nationwide network of language activists.

Biography
Mehmet Muslimov was born in Saint Petersburg. He received a Master of Arts in ethnology from the European University at Saint Petersburg and a Candidate of Sciences degree from the Institute for Linguistic Studies of the Russian Academy of Sciences, where he has been working ever since. His thesis was dedicated to language contact in Western Ingria and written under the academic supervision of Evgeny Golovko. Muslimov teaches the endangered Votic and Ingrian languages at a local cultural centre in Saint Petersburg.

Selected publications

 Muslimov, Mehmet. 2009. K klassifikacii finskih dialektov Ingermanlandii. In Voprosy uralistiki: 179–204. Saint Petersburg: Nauka.
 Muslimov, Mehmet. 2012. "Narodnaya dialektologija" v nižnelužskom areale. Acta Linguistica Petropolitana 8(1): 135–193.

References

Living people
Linguists from Russia
1964 births
Language activists
Writers from Saint Petersburg